The Libing Square railway station is an underground railway station. The railway station is on the Lidui Branch Line of Chengdu–Dujiangyan Intercity Railway in Chengdu, Sichuan, China. This station has been fully built but no trains currently stop at Libing Square.

See also
Chengdu–Dujiangyan Intercity Railway

References

Stations on the Chengdu–Dujiangyan Intercity Railway
Railway stations in Sichuan